Brachypeza archytas, commonly known as the sage orchid, is an epiphytic orchid that is endemic to Christmas Island, an Australian territory in the north-eastern Indian Ocean. It has many cord-like roots, four or five leaves arranged like a fan and a large number of small, crowded, short-lived, white flowers.

Description
Brachypeza archytas has short stems which are obscured by aerial roots. The side lobes are round with purple markings. Flowering occurs from October to April but the flowers only last for one or two days and the buds often fall off without opening.

Taxonomy and naming
The sage orchid was first formally described in 1891 by Henry Nicholas Ridley who gave it the name Saccolabium archytas and published the description in the Journal of the Straits Branch of the Royal Asiatic Society. In 1972, Leslie Andrew Garay changed the name to Brachypeza archytas. The specific epithet (archytas) is a reference to the Classical Greek philosopher Archytas.

Distribution and habitat
Brachypeza archytas is found only on Christmas Island where it is relatively common, especially in rainforest on the island’s lower terraces where it is often found on the lower part of large tree trunks, such as those of Tristiropsis acutangula and Gyrocarpus americanus.

References

External links
 Photograph of the Sage Orchid by David Banks at the Internet Orchid Species Photo Encyclopedia
Colnect, Catalogo di francobolli : Francobollo , Brachypeza archytas (photo of orchid on postage stamp)

archytas
Endemic flora of Christmas Island
Plants described in 1891
Endemic orchids of Australia
Taxa named by Henry Nicholas Ridley